Agnes Nandutu is a female Ugandan journalist, politician and Minister in charge of Karamoja. In 2020 she participated in the National Resistance Movement Party primaries which she lost to incumbent Woman MP Justin Khainza, and in the 2021 general election, running as an independent, she was elected Women's Representative for Bududa District.

Career 
Nandutu was born in Bududa District, Uganda. She was a senior political reporter at NTV Uganda. Nandutu was also a moderator and a speaker for NTV citizen debate show called "The People’s Parliament." She served as the president of the Parliamentary Journalist's Association from 2011 to 2016. She scripts and narrates the Popular satire Friday segment called Point Blank on NTV Uganda. In 2011, she received a Christmas gift from The Observer for her NTV show, Point Blank.

Background and education 
Nandutu  belongs to the Bantu ethnic group  who are the Gisu people. Nandutu attended Bumwali primary school for her elementary education, she then joined Bbulo girls secondary and later Blucheke secondary school for her high school education.  In 1997, she joined Radio Uganda  as a reporter. Later, she pursued a diploma in Journalism at Uganda Institute of Journalism and Media studies. She worked at Daily Monitor as a freelance reporter. Between 2002 and 2008, Nandutu worked at Impact FM as a staff reporter before she joined NTV Uganda.

Other controversies 
In 2017, Nandutu was denied accreditation to cover the Ugandan parliament by the organization's communications director.

In 2020 during the parliamentary campaigns, Nandutu was tasked to present her husband, something she didn't do and instead asked the electorate over the radio to find her a suitor and implored them to focus on effective representation instead of marriage. the marriage issue was contentious in the public.  Nandutu self confessed that she is a mother of seven children though she wished not to divulge more details about it while on an interview with the observer news paper.

See also 

 Bududa District

References and Links 

Living people
Ugandan Anglicans
Ugandan journalists
Ugandan women journalists
Ugandan radio journalists
Ugandan women radio journalists
Ugandan women television presenters
Ugandan women radio presenters
Ugandan women television journalists
Year of birth missing (living people)
People from Bududa District
Members of the Parliament of Uganda
Women members of the Parliament of Uganda
Independent politicians in Uganda
21st-century Ugandan politicians
21st-century Ugandan women politicians